Jonathan Richard (born 21 June 1991) is a footballer who currently plays for AFC in the Dutch Tweede Divisie. Born in the Netherlands, Richard represented the Curacao national team in 2015, before switching to represent the Aruba national team.

Career

AFC

Returning to AFC Amsterdam in 2014, Richard was praised by their coach Willem Leushuis for his effervescent and sociable personality, netting two goals in two games in a row as well.

International

Making his first outing for the Curacao national team in a 2015 unofficial friendly fronting Suriname, Richard was selected for the Curacao squad in their two 2018 World Cup qualifiers facing Cuba. He made his debut in competitive games on 2 June 2021, starting for Aruba in the match against Cayman Islands in 2022 FIFA World Cup qualification.

References

External links
 at Soccerway
 at National-Football-Teams

1991 births
Living people
Footballers from Amsterdam
Aruban footballers
Aruba international footballers
Aruban people of Curaçao descent
Curaçao footballers
Curaçao international footballers
Dutch footballers
Dutch people of Curaçao descent
Dutch people of Aruban descent
Association football midfielders
Amsterdamsche FC players
Tweede Divisie players
OFC Oostzaan players